Udea scorialis is a species of moth in the family Crambidae. It is found on Sicily.

References

Moths described in 1847
scorialis
Endemic fauna of Italy
Moths of Europe